Boussingaultite is a rare ammonium magnesium hydrated sulfate mineral of the chemical formula: (NH4)2Mg(SO4)2 · 6 H2O. The formula of boussingaultite is that of Tutton's salts type. It was originally described from geothermal fields in Tuscany, Italy, where it occurs together with its iron analogue mohrite, but is more commonly found on burning coal dumps. The mineral possess monoclinic symmetry and forms clear, often rounded crystals.

The mineral is named after the French chemist Jean-Baptiste Boussingault (1802–1887).

See also
 Mohr's salt
 Mohrite

References

Ammonium minerals
Magnesium minerals
Sulfate minerals
Hydrates
Monoclinic minerals
Minerals in space group 14